The list of ship launches in 1682 includes a chronological list of some ships launched in 1682.


References

1682
Ship launches